Brother is the fourth studio album by Irish boy band Boyzone, released on 5 March 2010 in Ireland. It is the band's first studio album in 12 years since Where We Belong (1998). The album is named in memory of member Stephen Gately, who died in 2009 five months before its release. However, Gately's vocals did appear on the band's songs "Gave It All Away" and "Stronger", making it the final album to feature Gately's vocals, until the release of Boyzone's final album in 2018.

Upon its release, Brother received favorable reviews from most music critics. The album debuted at number one in Ireland and the United Kingdom. As of October 2013, the album had sold 450,000 copies worldwide.

Background
It became their first studio album released in 12 years since their last album, Where We Belong released in 1998. This album is named in memory of member Stephen Gately, who died five months before its release. However, Gately's vocals did appear on the band's songs "Gave It All Away" and "Stronger", making it the final album to feature Gately's vocals and is released posthumously. Unlike their first three albums, none of the tracks were written or co-written by the group members.

The album was recorded in 2009, and was released on 5 March 2010 in Republic of Ireland and was released on 8 March 2010 in the United Kingdom. The album contains the single "Gave It All Away", released as a tribute to Gately and also features his vocals on the song "Stronger". The record entered the UK Album Chart at number 1 on 14 March 2010, making it Boyzone's fourth consecutive studio album to reach number 1 in the UK. The album also reached the number 1 slot in Ireland, resulting in the same achievement for all four albums, cementing the band's reputation as being one of the most successful boyband/male groups of all time in the UK and Ireland. On 28 March 2010, the album reclaimed the top spot in the UK album charts after a week at number 3. On the same day, the single "Gave It All Away" climbed 19 places to number 10 on the UK singles chart. 'Love Is a Hurricane' was the second and final single from 'Brother', and was released on 17 May.

Promotion
"Gave It All Away" was performed on the Australian version of the X Factor on 11 October 2010. The band toured the album in the UK and Ireland during February and March 2011 - the Brother Tour.

Critical reception

The album received favorable and positive reviews from most music critics. Jason Birchmeier from Allmusic said that: "Brother is a safe and carefully crafted album". And has noticed that the album is "a ballad-heavy effort with lots of piano melodies, string arrangements, and grandiose choruses". Further, he gave positive reaction for the songs 'Gave It All Away', calling it "a good song with glimmers of greatness" and 'Love Is a Hurricane' saying that "is the most impressive track on the album, showcase for Keating that marks the high point of Brother".

Other tracks include 'Ruby' and 'Right Here Waiting'.
Simon Gage from Daily Express said that "The first album since the death of Stephen Gately last year, is a poignant outing for Boyzone and features the last recorded vocals of their 'brother'". He also said that: "The debut single Gave It All Away sets the tone for what is a much more grown-up album of songs that veer closer to adult rock than the sometimes cheesy pop we associate with Boyzone."

Mike Diver from BBC said that: “It’s soft about its edges, its lyrical content exclusively syrupy – but that’s fine, as at this stage in their career, pronounced progression was never a likely option". He also said that: "It’s sad, though, that Gately eulogy-of-sorts Gave It All Away is so very poor". But with ballads dominating, "Brother is a Boyzone album for Boyzone fans". Lauren Murphy from Entertainment.ie said that: "Employing some known songwriters of the pop world makes Boyzone's fourth album 'Brother' a less amateur sounding affair than the now quartet's usual material". But she liked some parts of the album, saying that it "is actually solid, occasionally even likeable adult-orientated pop".

Commercial performance
The album topped the UK Albums Chart, while at No. 1 for three weeks, it was their fifth UK and Irish No. 1 album and Ireland albums chart where it charted in the top 75 for 17 weeks and the first single was a number 1 single on the Irish Singles Chart and a top 10 hit on the UK Singles Chart. As of December 2014, Brother has sold 394,872 copies in the UK.

Track listing

Notes
 signifies a vocal producer

Credits adapted from the liner notes of Brother.

Personnel 

Ray Burmiston – photography
Andy Caine – vocals
Simon Emmett – cover photo
Mark "Tufty" Evans – engineer
Serban Ghenea – mixing
John Hanes – assistant
Mark Herman – design
Ollie Jacobs – vocal producer
Steve Lipson – guitar, producer, mixing, instrumentation
Ian MacGregor – engineer
Chris Nicoladies – drum programming
Mark Plunkett – management
Ash Soan – drums
Peter-John Vetesse – engineer, choir arrangement
Greg Wells – bass, guitar, piano, drums, producer, mixing
Rob Wells – programming
Craig Wiseman – guitar

Chart positions

Weekly charts

Year-end charts

Certifications

References

2010 albums
Boyzone albums
Albums published posthumously